Orthotylus modestus is a species of plant bug in the family Miridae. It is found in North America.

Subspecies
These two subspecies belong to the species Orthotylus modestus:
 Orthotylus modestus immaculatus Knight, 1923
 Orthotylus modestus modestus Van Duzee, 1916

References

Further reading

 

modestus
Articles created by Qbugbot
Insects described in 1916